Sunset is a town in Crittenden County, Arkansas, United States. The population was 198 at the 2010 census.

Geography
Sunset is located in east-central Crittenden County at  (35.221540, -90.204965). It is surrounded by the city of Marion.

Demographics

As of the census of 2000, there were 348 people, 135 households, and 85 families residing in the city. The racial makeup of the city was 4.89% White, 91.09% Black or African American, 2.87% from other races, and 1.15% from two or more races.  4.02% of the population were Hispanic or Latino of any race.

There were 135 households, out of which 26.7% had children under the age of 18 living with them, 22.2% were married couples living together, 34.8% had a female householder with no husband present, and 37.0% were non-families. 33.3% of all households were made up of individuals, and 13.3% had someone living alone who was 65 years of age or older.  The average household size was 2.58 and the average family size was 3.35.

In the city the population was spread out, with 29.6% under the age of 18, 8.0% from 18 to 24, 25.6% from 25 to 44, 20.7% from 45 to 64, and 16.1% who were 65 years of age or older.  The median age was 37 years. For every 100 females, there were 87.1 males.  For every 100 females age 18 and over, there were 84.2 males.

The median income for a household in the city was $17,788, and the median income for a family was $17,250. Males had a median income of $21,750 versus $20,625 for females. The per capita income for the city was $7,766.  About 44.4% of families and 49.9% of the population were below the poverty line, including 79.6% of those under age 18 and 27.9% of those age 65 or over.

Education
Sunset is in the Marion School District. Its comprehensive high school is Marion High School.

Gallery

References

External links
Crittenden County website

Towns in Crittenden County, Arkansas
Towns in Arkansas
Memphis metropolitan area